The South Gambier Football & Netball Club is an Australian rules football and netball club from Mount Gambier, South Australia. They are currently competing in the Western Border Football League.

History
The South Gambier Football Club (firstly known as the South Mount Gambier Football Club) was formed in 1926 with the establishment of the South Eastern Football Association. The club made the grand final of the first season, but lost to Naracoorte. The club met the same team in the 1927 premiership, however this time they prevailed by 32 points.

In 1938 the club made the move to the Mid South East Football Association, however the following season was abandoned due to WWII. Following the war, the club reformed and joined the newly-formed Mount Gambier and District Football Association in 1946. South Gambier won premierships in both 1949 and 1951 before the league was renamed the South-East & Border Football League, which it remained in until the establishment of the Western Border Football League in 1964 (after a merger with the Western District Football League).

South Gambier made its first appearance in a grand final in the WBFL in 1970, losing to Hamilton by 80 points. The Demons first WBFL premiership win was recorded in 1974, beating East Gambier by 34 points. The club continued to make regular premiership appearances, winning in 1992, 1994, 1996-7-8-9-2000, 2002, 2005, 2009, and finally in 2015.

Premierships

Notable Sportspeople

WBFL Medalists
B Smith (1971)
L Bell (1986)
R Elliot (1992)
M Ryan (1996)
B Howard (2004)
J Copping (2006)
S Berkefeld (2011)

Entertainment
On 3 January 1976, the South Gambier Football Club was the host to Australian rock band AC/DC. The band played a setlist of nine songs for their first of two concerts in 1976 in Mount Gambier.

See also
Western Border Football League
North Gambier Football Club
East Gambier Football Club
Mount Gambier

References

External links
 
 Gameday website

1926 establishments in Australia
Western Border Football League
Australian rules football clubs established in 1926
Australian rules football clubs in South Australia
Mount Gambier, South Australia